Kastania is a village in Pieria, Greece. Since the 2011 local government reform it is part of the municipality Pydna-Kolindros, of which it is a municipal community. The 2011 census recorded 249 residents in the village.

References

Populated places in Pieria (regional unit)